HacDC is a hackerspace in Washington, D.C., and a 501(c)(3) nonprofit. According to one member's description, "HacDC members improve the world by creatively rethinking technology. We break, build, and occasionally abuse technology in the pursuit of greater knowledge about how it works and re-purpose it to build new things." In March 2009, its activities were described by The Washington Post. In April 2011, its activities were also mentioned by FastCompany., and NPR's All Tech Considered.

Membership 

HacDC encourages participation by anyone who feels they can contribute, and non-members are welcome at the space at any time.  All workshops and activities are free, with some exceptions for materials costs, and all are open to the public.  As of January 2015, membership stands at 50 people. Dues, which give organizational voting rights, are $60 per month as of January 2015.

HacDC's active pool of members brings a wide range of skills an interests to the community—ranging from science, visual and performing arts, electronics and mechanical design.  This results in some very unusual and interesting collaborations among members, some of which have appeared at Washington, DC area art exhibits and performances.

Physical space 

HacDC is located on the second floor of the office building for St. Stephen and the Incarnation Episcopal Church, 1525 Newton St. NW, at the intersection of 16th and Newton Streets, NW, in the Columbia Heights neighborhood of Washington, DC.

The space has a classroom-workshop upstairs for meetings, presentations, classes and electronics projects. It includes tools, a soldering station, electronic diagnostic equipment and several 3D printers. A separate basement room is mainly used for heavier tools and parts storage but also includes a drill press, CNC mill, sheet metal bender and optical table. The church's common spaces are available for larger events.

Activities 

Some past and present programs and activities include:

 Microcontroller Workshops and Projects: Microcontroller Mondays, AVR Class
 3D Printing, printer assembly and repair, 3D part design using ImplicitCAD.
 FPGA Workshops and Projects
 Kit Builds and Kit Designing Nikolas's LED heart kit, Adafruit game of life kit build
 HacDC Lightning Talks
 NARG - Natural Language and AI Research Group
 Gentle Hacker's Literary Salon
 RepRap 3D printer 
 HacDC Spaceblimp
 CRISPR-Cas9 bacterial gene editing project.
 Scanning electron microscope refurbishment project.
 The Elements of Computing Systems class
 Bike Maintenance class
 Participating in the Great Global Hackerspace Challenge 
 Experimentation with Mobile Ad Hoc Networking 

A more updated list can be found on the official calendar.

References

External links 
 HacDC.org
 Hackerspaces.org

Hacker groups
Computer clubs
Hackerspaces
Organizations established in 2008
2008 establishments in Washington, D.C.
Non-profit organizations based in Washington, D.C.